Buvayda is a district of Fergana Region in Uzbekistan. The capital lies at the town Ibrat. The district consists of 10 urban-type settlements (Ibrat, Yuqori Bachqir, Quyi Bachqir, Chinobod, Buvayda, Zarbuloq, Qum, Yuqori Nayman, Oqqoʻrgʻon, Quyi Urganji) and 11 rural communities.

References

Districts of Uzbekistan
Fergana Region